Chamarkand is an area of Safi Tehsil, Mohmand Agency, Federally Administered Tribal Areas, Pakistan. In 2017, the population was 11,296.

References

Populated places in Mohmand District